The 22nd Lambda Literary Awards were held in 2010, to honour works of LGBT literature published in 2009.

Special awards

Nominees and winners

External links
 22nd Lambda Literary Awards

Lambda Literary Awards
Lambda
Lists of LGBT-related award winners and nominees
2010 in LGBT history
2010 awards in the United States